The discography of Moose Blood, a British rock band, consists of three studio albums, three extended plays and three singles.

Studio albums

Extended plays

Singles

Music videos

References

Discographies of British artists